Fictional espionage organizations with fancy-sounding acronyms are a common theme in spy fiction. Such acronyms are similarly also common in superhero fiction and science fiction.

Overview
During the 1960s trend for action-adventure spy thrillers, it was a common practice for fictional spy organizations or their nemeses to employ names that were contrived acronyms. Sometimes these acronyms' expanded meanings made sense, but most of the time they were words incongruously crammed together for the mere purpose of obtaining a catchy acronym, traditionally a heroic sounding one for the good guys and an appropriately menacing one for the bad guys. This has become one of the most commonly parodied clichés of the spy thriller genre. They were presumably inspired by SMERSH, which appeared in the James Bond stories and sounded fictional, but really was a branch of Soviet intelligence. These acronyms are often spelled with periods/points/stops to make it clear that they stand for longer terms and are not simply the usual English words that they resemble, even though the punctuation would otherwise seem to indicate that the abbreviations should be pronounced as the names of the individual letters.

List
Among the most popular:
 A.C.M.E. (Agency to Classify & Monitor Evildoers), a fictional crime intelligence agency in Carmen Sandiego.
 A.C.R.O.S.T.I.C. (A Cabal Recently Organized Solely To Instigate Crimes), enemies of the Zoo Crew.
A.I.M. (Advanced Idea Mechanics), a fictional Marvel Comics terrorist organization, whose members are memorable for wearing yellow Hazmat or radiation suits as uniforms, which make them resemble an army of beekeepers.
 A.N.V.I.L., a fictional agency representing China and southeast Asia in the video game Evil Genius
 A.P.E. (Agency to Prevent Evil) and C.H.U.M.P. (Criminal Headquarters for the Underworld's Master Plan), from Lancelot Link, Secret Chimp
 A.R.M.O.R. (Alternate Reality Monitoring and Operational Responses) a fictional branch of SHIELD in Marvel Comics founded to keep an eye on parallel universes.
 A.P.O. (Authorized Personnel Only), a fictional black-ops division of the CIA on the television series Alias
 B.L.U. (Builder's League United), a front for one of the two warring companies in Team Fortress 2. Blue uniforms.
 B.R.U.T.E.  (Bureau for Random Unlawful Terror and Evil), a terrorist organization in the Micro Adventure series of kids' books.
 C.I.S.O. (Canadian International Security Organization), from Richard Comely's Captain Canuck comic book series.
 C.L.I.T.O.R.I.S. (The Committee for the Liberation and Integration of Terrifying Organisms and their Rehabilitation Into Society), from Red Dwarf
 C.M.D.F. (Combined Miniature Deterrent Forces), from the movie Fantastic Voyage.   In the television animated cartoon series, the acronym stood for Combined Miniature Defense Force.
 C.O.B.R.A. (Criminal Organization of Bloodiness, Revenge and Assassination), an international terrorist organization, headed by Cobra Commander, from the G.I. Joe series.
 CONTROL, the fictional government agency in the TV Show Get Smart.
 C.O.P.S. (Central Organization of Police Specialists), the crime-fighting organization from the 1988 animated TV series of the same name.
 C.R.A.S.H. (Community Resources Against Street Hoodlums), division of the Los Angeles Police Department, parodied in Grand Theft Auto: San Andreas.
 D.A.R.C. (Directorate for Anarchy, Revenge, and Chaos), from the television series Robocop: Alpha Commando
 E.R.I.S., from the movie Agent Cody Banks
 F.E.A.R. (First Encounter Assault Recon), in the horror-themed first-person-shooter computer game F.E.A.R..
 F.I.R.M., from the Airwolf television series
 F.L.A.G. (Foundation for Law And Government), from the original Knight Rider
 F.O.W.L. (Fiendish Organization for World Larceny), in cartoon series, Darkwing Duck. This organization originated in the DuckTales episode "Double-o-Duck", but was called the Foreign Organization there.
 G.A.G. (Galactic Alliance Guard), a secret police force commanded by Darth Caedus in the Legacy of the Force series
 G.A.S. (Galactic Alliance Security), from the Fate of the Jedi series
 G.A.R. (Grand Army of the Republic), from Star Wars prequel trilogy
 G.D.I. (Global Defense Initiative), from the Command & Conquer video game series.
 G.L.A (Global Liberation Army), from the Command & Conquer video game series.
 G.R.A.M.P.A. (Global Reaction Agency for Mysterious Paranormal Activity), an international intelligence agency in Marvel Comics.
 G.O.D (Government of Darkness), an evil secret organisation from Kamen Rider X.
 G.R.O.S.S. (Get Rid Of Slimy girlS), an organization founded by Calvin from the Calvin and Hobbes comic series which seeks to exclude girls because of their inherent slimy nature.
 H.A.M.M.E.R., a fictional agency representing former USSR territories and Cuba in the video game Evil Genius
 H.A.R.M., from the No One Lives Forever (NOLF) series of computer games, which were released in the 1990s, but were based in 1960s pop culture. What H.A.R.M. actually stands for is never revealed, and speculation about its true meaning is the subject of several jokes in both games. (However, in the 1966 spy film Agent for H.A.R.M., it stands for Human Aetiological Relations Machine.)
 H.A.T.E. (Highest Anti Terrorism Effort) from Marvel.
 H.A.T.E. (Humanitarian Alliance for Total Espionage) the "bad guys" organization from the pulp novel series "The Lady from L.U.S.T." (see L.U.S.T. below)
 H.E.A.T. (Harmony's Elite Assault Team), from Angel of H.E.A.T.
 H.E.A.T. (Hemisphere Emergency Action Team) from Acapulco H.E.A.T.
 H.I.V.E. (Hierarchy of International Vengeance and Extermination), a villainous organization that combats the Teen Titans and other DC Comics superheroes.
 H.U.N.T. (High-risk United Nations Task-force), from Rise of the Triad
HYDRA is an exception in that the name is not an acronym but rather a reference to the mythical Lernaean Hydra; the name's capitalization exists per Marvel's official spelling only.
 I.A.A. (International Affairs Agency), from Grand Theft Auto V
 I.C.A. (International Contract Agency) is the secret organisation that is the backbone of the Hitman games
 I.S.I.S. (International Secret Intelligence Service) is the agency employing the lead characters in Archer (2009 TV series).
 I.C.E. (Intelligence and Counter-Espionage) is the agency that employs Matt Helm in the Matt Helm movie series starring Dean Martin.
 I.M.F. (Impossible Missions Force) from the Mission: Impossible series and the movies that it inspired (not to be confused with the International Monetary Fund).
 K.A.B.O.O.M. (Key Atomic Benefits Organization of Mankind), from the movie The Naked Gun 2½: The Smell of Fear.
 KAOS, the enemy organization in the TV Show Get Smart.
 L.O.V.E.M.U.F.F.I.N. (The League Of Villainous Evildoers Maniacally United For Frightening Investments in Naughtiness) from the series Phineas and Ferb, is an organization dedicated to promoting evil. It was presumably founded by Dr. Heinz Doofenshmirtz.
 L.U.S.T., (League of Undercover Spies and Terrorists) the "good guys" organization from the pulp novel series "The Lady from L.U.S.T." (see H.A.T.E. above)
 M.A.S.K. (Mobile Armored Strike Kommand), the good mask-wearing cohort from the 1980s Saturday-morning cartoon M.A.S.K.
 N.A.S.T.Y. (National Association of Spies, Traitors and Yahoos), opponents of Roger Ramjet
 N.I.D. (National Intelligence Department), from Stargate SG-1.
 N.R.I (New Republic Intelligence), from Star Wars
 O.D.I.N. (Organization of Democratic Intelligence Networks) is a rival European agency that the lead characters in Archer (2009 TV series) are frequently competing with.
 O.S.I. (Office of Secret Intelligence), a fictional intelligence Britannian affiliated agency in the Code Geass universe. Its main tasks are espionage, black ops, intelligence gathering, counter-intelligence and assassination.
 O.S.I. (Office of Scientific Intelligence), a fictional intelligence agency in the Six Million Dollar Man universe. It was headed by Oscar Goldman of which Steve Austin (The Bionic Man) and later, Jaime Sommers (The Bionic Woman), were its primary agents.
 O.W.C.A. (Organization Without a Cool Acronym), a top-secret organization that uses animals for secret agents, from Phineas and Ferb
 P.A.T.R.I.O.T., a fictional agency representing the US and Japan in the video game Evil Genius
 P.R.F. (People's Revolutionary Front), a terrorist agency from the TV show Alias
 R.A.S. (Rescue Aid Society), from the movies The Rescuers and The Rescuers Down Under
 R.E.D. (Reliable Excavation (and) Demolition), a front for one of the warring companies in Team Fortress 2. Red uniforms.
 S.A.B.R.E., a fictional agency representing the UK, Australia, and India in the video game Evil Genius
 S.A.V.A.G.E. (Specialist-Administrators of Vengeance, Anarchy and Global Extortion), from the animated TV series Rambo: The Force of Freedom
 S.CORP.I.A., (Sabotage, Corruption, Intelligence and Assassination) a criminal organization from the fictional series, Alex Rider.
 S.H.A.D.O. (Supreme Headquarters Alien Defense Organization) in the Gerry Anderson television series UFO.
 S.H.I.E.L.D. (originally Supreme Headquarters, International Espionage, Law Enforcement Division; later Strategic Hazard Intervention, Espionage and Logistics Directorate and Strategic Homeland Intervention, Enforcement and Logistics Division), from the Nick Fury, Agent of S.H.I.E.L.D. Marvel Comics.
 S.H.O.C.K.E.R (Sacred Hegemony of Cycle Kindred Evolutionary Realm) is an evil secret organisation in Kamen Rider: The First. It is a rebooted version of an eponymous organisation from the original Kamen Rider, where it wasn't an acronym.
 S.H.U.S.H., from Darkwing Duck.
 S.K.O.O.L. (Secret Knowledge Of Organized Lawbreakers) in the Hardy Boys book, Secret Agent of Flight 101.
 S.M.A.S.H., a fictional agency representing Africa, South America, and Antarctica in the video game Evil Genius
 S.M.E.L.L.Y. (Society of Meaningless Evil, Larceny, Lying and Yelling), the antagonist of the children's video game Spy Fox 2: "Some Assembly Required"
 S.N.A.F.U. (Society of Nefarious And Felonious Undertakings), a terrorist organization from the short-lived Nickelodeon animated series, The X's
 SPECTRE (Special Executive for Counter-intelligence, Terrorism, Revenge, and Extortion), from the James Bond series.
 S.T.E.N.C.H. (Society for the Total Extermination of Non-Conforming Humans) in the film Carry On Spying and the radio series Round the Horne.
 S.P.I.D.E.R. (Secret People's International Directorate for Extralegal Revenue), the adversaries of the T.H.U.N.D.E.R. Agents from Tower Comics (see below).
 S.S.S.S.S. Squad (Super Special Sonic Search and Smash Squad) from The Adventures of Sonic the Hedgehog
 S.T.A.R.S. (Special Tactics And Rescue Service), from the Resident Evil video game series.
 S.T.R.I.K.E. (Special Tactical Reserve for International Key Emergencies), a fictional counter-terrorism and intelligence agency in the Marvel Comics Universe (S.T.R.I.K.E. is the United Kingdom's version of S.H.I.E.L.D. and first appeared in Captain Britain Weekly #17).
 S.W.A.M.P. (Sinister Wrongdoers Against Mankind's Preservation), from Spy Kids: Mission Critical, a future Netflix animated series
 S.W.O.R.D. (Sentient World Observation and Response Department), from  Marvel Comics.
 Tenet, a secret organization that uses time inversion to perform temporal pincer movements from the 2020 film Tenet.
 T.H.U.N.D.E.R. (The Higher United Nations Defense Enforcement Reserves), from Tower Comics.
 T.I.A. (Técnicos Investigación Aeroterráquea) translating into "Aeroterraquatic (air, land, sea) Investigation Technicians", from the Spanish comic strip Mortadelo y Filemón.
 U.G.L.I. (Undercover Global League of Informants) in the Hardy Boys book, Secret Agent of Flight 101.
 U.L.T.I.M.A.T.U.M. (Underground Liberated Totally Integrated Mobile Army To Unite Mankind) from Marvel Comics.
 U.N.C.L.E. (United Network Command for Law and Enforcement) and T.H.R.U.S.H., from The Man from U.N.C.L.E.. (The meaning of T.H.R.U.S.H. was never revealed on the series; but, in the novelizations it was stated to be "Technological Hierarchy for the Removal of Undesirables and the Subjugation of Humanity".)
 U.N.I.T. (United Nations Intelligence Taskforce) A military organization formed to investigate and combat paranormal and extraterrestrial threats to the Earth in the series Doctor Who. UNIT was rebranded as the UNified Intelligence Taskforce in 2008, after the United Nations expressed its discomfort with being associated with a fictional paramilitary organization.
 V.A.C.U.U.M. (Volunteer Agents Crusading Unsteadily Under Mongoose), from the Donald Sobol book Secret Agents Four.
 V.E.N.O.M. (The Vicious, Evil Network Of Mayhem), the evil mask-wearing cohort from the 1980s Saturday-morning cartoon M.A.S.K.
 V.F.D., (Volunteer Fire Department) a secret organization from the book series A Series of Unfortunate Events and its adaptations.
 V.I.L.E. (The Villains' International League of Evil), Carmen Sandiego's band of international thieves.
 V.S.S.E. (Vital Situation, Swift Elimination), from the Time Crisis video game series.
 W.I.C.K.E.D. (World In Catastrophe : Killzone Experiment Department), from The Maze Runner book and movie series. 
 W.A.S.P. (World Aquanaut Security Patrol), from the Gerry Anderson TV series, Stingray
 W.C.P.O. (World Criminal Police Organization), from the Rolling Thunder video game series (not to be confused with the ABC TV station in Cincinnati, Ohio).
 W.O.O.H.P. (World Organization of Human Protection), the fictional organization from Totally Spies!, an animated series on Cartoon Network.
 Z.O.W.I.E. (Zonal Organization for World Intelligence and Espionage), from the movies Our Man Flint and In Like Flint

Various fiction invent British spy agencies with "MI numbers" other than the well-known MI5 or MI6. Examples include MI7 in Johnny English, M.I.9 in M.I. High, and MI-13 in Marvel Comics. These agencies generally have no relation to the real but defunct branches of the Directorate of Military Intelligence that previously used these designations.

See also

Espionage